The 2002–03 Luxembourg National Division was the 89th season of top level association football in Luxembourg.

Overview
It was performed in 12 teams, and Grevenmacher won the championship.

First phase

Table

Results

Second phase

Championship stage

Table

Results

Relegation stage

Group A

Table

Results

Group B

Table

Results

References
Luxembourg – List of final tables (RSSSF)

Luxembourg National Division seasons
Luxembourg National Division, 2002-03
1